The Labour Party South Sudan (LPSS) is a political party which is based in South Sudan and is led by Federico Awi Vuni.

References

External links
Laboursouthsudan.org

Political parties in South Sudan
Social democratic parties in Africa
Organisations based in Juba